A peak's line parent is the closest higher peak on the highest ridge leading away from the peak's "key col".  A col is the lowest point on the ridge between two summits and is roughly synonymous with pass, gap, saddle and notch. The highest col of a peak is its key col. If there is more than one ridge which can be followed to a higher peak then the line parent is the peak closest to the key col. Usually, a line parent must meet some prominence criteria, which might vary depending on the author and the location of the peak.

There are at least two other kinds of peak parentage. Island parentage, which is also referred to as encirclement or topographic parentage; and source parentage.

See also 
 Topographic prominence

References

External links 
 

Mountains